Naylor and Sale was an architectural practice based in Derby between 1887 and 1923.

History
John Reginald Naylor (1854 – 4 February 1923) was the son of a former vicar of St Peter and St Paul's Church, Upton, Nottinghamshire. He was articled to Mr. Townsend of Peterborough, and afterwards was a pupil in the office of George Gilbert Scott. He then worked for James Fowler in Louth, and commenced independent practice in Derby in 1878. In that year he took on Sale as an improver.

George Hansom Sale (1857 – 18 August 1954) had been articled to Frederick Josias Robinson in 1874 remaining with him until 1878. The partnership of Naylor and Sale was established in 1887 

The practice was involved in many church restorations in the East Midlands, and also worked for the Provincial Cinematograph Theatres Limited, in the erection of at least 14 of their theatres in different cities and towns. 

John Reginald Naylor was elected an Associate of the Royal Institute of British Architects in 1881 and a fellow in 1894. In 1891 he was elected to Derby Town Council as a representative of Babington Ward.

The practice was dissolved on Naylor's death in 1923, and Sale formed a partnership with Joseph Alfred Woore, Charles H R Naylor and Bernard Widdows in Derby.

Works

References

Architecture firms of England
1887 establishments
1923 disestablishments
Companies based in Derby
Architects from Derby